{
  "type": "FeatureCollection",
  "features": [
    {
      "type": "Feature",
      "properties": {
        "marker-color": "#ff0000",
        "marker-size": "small",
        "marker-symbol": "circle"
      },
      "geometry": {
        "type": "Point",
        "coordinates": [
          92.7407670021057,
          11.670855479324866
        ]
      }
    }
  ]
}
The Battle of Aberdeen, on the Andaman Islands of India close to Port Blair, was an armed conflict that occurred  on 14 May 1859 (according to Portman but 17 May according to other sources) between the natives of the Andaman islands, armed with arrows and spears, and the gun-bearing officers and to some extent the convicts (Indian independence activists) of the Ross Island Penal Colony. There had been skirmishes with the British colonials right from 1857 when the penal settlement was established. The plan of the impending attack by the natives was revealed by Dudhnath Tewari, an escaped convict who had lived with them. Tewari, convict number 276, had escaped on 6 April 1858 with several other prisoners from Ross Island and had been taken prisoner by the tribals after the others had been killed. Tewari had then been accepted and allowed to live with the tribals, and even made to marry two tribal girls. When he heard of the plan to attack the prison colony, Tewari returned on 23 April to inform the superintendent of the penal colony, Dr J.P. Walker of the impending attack. The natives were armed with only bows and arrows, spears and knives while the British were equipped with firearms. Tewari had been imprisoned for his desertion and role in the Indian Rebellion of 1857 and his account has been questioned by some authors.

The prelude to the battle was long drawn out series of skirmishes. On 6 April 1859, 248 convicts were shot at with arrows by 200 tribals on Haddo (derived from the Haddo House). On 14 April another bunch of convicts were attacked at noon by 1,500 armed tribals. The convicts were forced to jump into the sea to escape. The tribals were described as showing intent to attack only those who did not have fetters (legcuffs) on them. According to the account of Portman, the Andamanese objected to the destruction of the jungle by clearings that were being made by convict workgangs. On 28 April a seaman aboard the schooner Charlotte was struck by an arrow off North Point and Dr Walker forbade anyone from landing there. On 14 May, the tribals attacked Aberdeen from Atalanta Point. The navy schooner Charlotte was nearby and fired its guns at the tribals. The British fended themselves with guns, and the natives never returned to fight again. Shortly after this incident Dr Walker resigned from duty and was succeeded by Colonel J.C. Haughton.

See also
 Sentinelese

References

External links 
  Jaiswal, O.N. 2002 The battle of Aberdeen in restrospect. Public Information Bureau
 A battle and a betrayal - Ajay Saini, The Hindu, 13 August 2017

History of the Andaman and Nicobar Islands
Conflicts in 1859
Rebellions in India